Keglevich is an Italian brand of vodka.

History 
Keglevich is a vodka brand of Stock, a liqueur company founded in 1884 by Lionello Stock. Keglevich Classic is distilled entirely from pure grain with the original recipe invented by the Hungarian-Croatian Graf of Buzin, Stephan Keglevich. Keglevich vodka is marketed in Europe, Russia, USA, Israel and Japan. Different tastes have been developed, new flavors have been created to the range, which now numbers 12 varieties, plus the original Keglevich Dry.

Keglevich Range 
Different tastes have been developed :

Keglevich Dry 
Keglevich Dry is a Vodka produced with pure grain realized using the traditional method set out in the original recipe of Count Keglevich in 1882.
Keglevich Dry vodka is absolutely clear and flawlessly transparent to the eye. It is used either for cocktails and long drinks.

Keglevich Fruits 
Keglevich is also available in a range of fruit-flavoured, vodka-based liqueurs.
Vodka Keglevich with fruit is the result of pure grain vodka and, depending on the variety, fruit or cream.
Also Keglevich fruit is used as a mixer and is excellent for the preparation of Cocktails and long drinks.

Here the following 12 varieties:

 Strawberry and Cream - A blend of vodka and strawberry flavour mixed with cream.
 Lemon - vodka and lemon juice.
 Melon - vodka and melon juice.
 Peach - vodka and peach juice.
 Strawberry - vodka and strawberry juice.
 Blood Orange - vodka and red orange juice.
 Raspberry and Coconut - vodka with raspberry & coconut
 Forestberries - vodka and berry fruits.
 Green Apple - vodka and apple juice
 Mint - vodka and mint.
 K-Guar - a triple distilled dry vodka, combined with distillate of ginseng and guaranà.
 Liquorice - vodka and liquorice.

Keglevich Klamour 
Keglevich Klamour is an aperitif that combines a triple distilled vodka with an infusion of herbs and passion fruit. Also Keglevich Klamour can be mixed in cocktails or be drunk on the rocks.
Its bittersweet taste results perfect for the aperitif moment well known in the Italian tradition.

References

External links
  Stock Italia
  Stock International

Italian brands
Italian vodkas